Michael de la Bastide, KC (born 18 July 1937 in Port of Spain, Trinidad & Tobago) is a Trinidad and Tobago lawyer. He was the Chief Justice of Trinidad and Tobago from 1995 until 2002.

Education 

He attended St. Mary’s College, Port of Spain, from 1945 to 1955. He moved on to read law at Christ Church, Oxford from 1956 to 1960. He received a Bachelor of Arts (Jurisprudence) in 1959 with First Class Honours and a Bachelor of Civil Law, also with First Class Honours in 1960.

Career 

He was Crown Counsel in the office of the Attorney-General of Trinidad & Tobago from 1961 till 1963. In 1975, he became a Queen's Counsel at the young age of 38. He went on to serve as an Independent Senator from 1976 to 1981. He was president of the Law Association from 1987 until 1990 prior to his appointment as Chief Justice in 1995. In 2005, he was sworn in as president of the Caribbean Court of Justice until his retirement in 2011.

References 

Living people
1937 births
Alumni of Christ Church, Oxford
Chief justices of Trinidad and Tobago
Presidents of the Caribbean Court of Justice
People from Port of Spain
20th-century Trinidad and Tobago judges
21st-century Trinidad and Tobago judges
Trinidad and Tobago Queen's Counsel